Camuffo di Portogruaro or Cantiere navale Camuffo is a ship producer from Portogruaro, Metropolitan City of Venice, Italy.

The shipyard was founded in 1438 in Heraklion, Crete under the rule of the Venetian Republic and is the oldest shipyard in the world.

See also 
List of oldest companies

References 

The article uses text from Cantiere navale Camuffo on Italian Wikipedia, retrieved on 24 February 2017.

External links 
Homepage

Shipbuilding companies of Italy
History of Venice
Companies established in the 15th century
15th-century establishments in Italy